Dennis Cary Mueller (born June 13, 1940) is emeritus professor of economics at the University of Vienna. His academic work focused on the principal–agent problem, corporate governance and political economy.

Career 
He received a PhD in economics from Princeton University in 1966 under the supervision of Jesse W. Markham and Stephen Goldfeld for his dissertation "The Determinants of Industrial Research and Development". He held several academic positions in Canada, the US and in Germany and became professor at the University of Vienna in 1994. In 2008, he became professor emeritus.

Work 
Mueller is a past president of the Public Choice Society, the Southern Economic Association, the Industrial Organization Society, and EARIE. His main research interests are in public choice and industrial economics. His work is mainly about high-ranking people taking advantage of informational transaction costs. Governments pursue their own agenda of enlarging to inefficient sizes in the name of public interest at the expense of true owners, citizens and taxpayers. Corporate managers pursue their own agenda of unnecessarily making companies large and efficient at the expense of the true owners, stockholders.

On public choice approach, he said, "Public choice approach is the economic study of non-market decision making or an application of economics to political science and to politico-administrative process of collective decision making."

External links

 Mueller's CV at University of Vienna  

1940 births
Living people
21st-century American economists
American political scientists
Princeton University alumni